Made in Sheffield is a 2008 album by Tony Christie, released on 10 November 2008.

Production
After hearing the song "Coles Corner" by Richard Hawley on the radio, Christie suggested that it was the type of production he should be striving for. Christie asked Hawley to be producer for a new version of the track. Hawley had previously sent him the album Coles Corner on its release in 2005 and readily agreed to produce a whole album with his co-producer Colin Elliott at their Yellow Arch Studios in Sheffield.
 
The recording project developed into a concept that the album should only feature songs written by Sheffield’s own songwriters, and new songs by Tony himself. Amongst those involved were the Arctic Monkeys who supplied the album's opener "Only Ones Who Know", Jarvis Cocker ("Born To Cry", a Pulp song from the Notting Hill soundtrack),  a stripped down piano and trumpet reworking of The Human League's synthpop classic "Louise" and a reworking of "Coles Corner" by Richard Hawley. Also involved were lesser known city songwriters Martin Bragger who contributes two songs ("Danger Is A Woman In Love" and "Paradise Square") and Sara Jay and Mark Sheridan.

Tony Christie said of the project  "We are a proud community and the artists that have hailed from Sheffield are some of the most exciting and successful UK artists in pop history. I wanted to celebrate our culture."

The album was generally positively received on release including the NME, The Observer, Times and The Guardian. The NME in particular labelled it as an 'unexpected delight and genuinely great record' and gave the album 7/10. The Guardian gave the album 4/5 labelling it 'a beautifully crafted album'. MusicOMH described it as a 'quite dignified record'.

Track listing

References

2008 albums
Tony Christie albums